Blue Jay is an unincorporated community located in San Bernardino County in California. It is located in the San Bernardino Mountains, above a region of California known as the Inland Empire.

It is within the San Bernardino National Forest. Blue Jay Village itself is located one mile from the southwestern bank of Lake Arrowhead.

The town is a part of the Lake Arrowhead Community.  Other towns in this community are Lake Arrowhead, Running Springs and Cedar Glen.

History
The town started as the homestead of Art and Norma Wixom. They leased a few vacation cabins and opened a store in 1914. Stoney DeMent leased the land and built a market called The Blue Jay Market in 1934. The store was named for the blue colored birds that live in the area, and this later became the name of the town built up around it. The naming of the town is something of a misnomer: the local variety of jay is actually the Steller's jay, not the closely related blue jay. While this is widely known in the area, the name has stuck. Residents began to move to Blue Jay about 10 years later. In 1978 Bluejay was purchased by H.R. "Rick" Kaufman through his company Pioneer Take Out Corporation aka Pioneer Chicken.

Today
Blue Jay Village today is home to 2,314 residents. It is considered the entertainment district of the Lake Arrowhead community. It contains a shopping center, a number of restaurants, a bank, the headquarters of The Rim of the World Unified School District, a movie theater, the Lake Arrowhead Library and many privately owned stores. The village also hosts many events including the Lake Arrowhead celebration of film, The Blue Jay Christmas parade, and the Blue Jay Jazz Festival.

References

External links
 https://web.archive.org/web/20060424054559/http://www.bluejayvillage.com/

San Bernardino Mountains
Unincorporated communities in San Bernardino County, California
Unincorporated communities in California
1914 establishments in California